The real was the currency of the Federal Republic of Central America from 1824 to 1838/1841. Sixteen silver reales equaled one gold escudo, and 8 reales equaled one peso. The Central American Republic's real replaced the Spanish colonial real at par and continued to circulate and be issued after the constituent states left the Central American Republic. The currency was replaced by the Costa Rican real, Salvadoran peso, Guatemalan peso, Honduran real and Nicaraguan peso.

References

Currencies of Central America
Modern obsolete currencies
19th-century economic history
Federal Republic of Central America
Currencies of Nicaragua
Currencies of Honduras
Currencies of Guatemala
1824 establishments in Central America